A play-off structure involving the top five teams was used to determine the winners of the Super League competition in British rugby league from 1998 until 2001. A top-six play-off system was then introduced. Apart from the grand final, all matches are staged at the home ground of the team placed higher in the final league table.

The same system was used in the NSWRL's Sydney Competition 1973–1994, the Super League in its only season 1997, the VFL, 1972–1990 and New Zealand's Lion Red Cup, 1994–1996, and Bartercard Cup, 2000–2006.

From week two on the top-five play-offs system reflects exactly the Page playoff system.

Procedure
Week one

 Qualification final: 2nd vs 3rd
 Elimination final: 4th vs 5th
 Bye: 1st

Week two

 Major semi-final: 1st vs winners of qualification final
 Minor semi-final: losers of qualification final vs winners of elimination final

Week three

 Preliminary final: losers of major semi-final vs winners of minor semi-final
 Bye: winners of major semi-final

Week four

 Grand final: winners of major semi-final vs winners of preliminary final

This is considered a good playoff system, as while it allows fifth place to take part, it is incredibly difficult for fourth and them to be crowned champions as they must beat every other team  at some point.

The only NSWRL team to win the premiership from 5th was Brisbane in 1993.

In elite Australian Rules Football, only twice have the premiers won from fifth – Norwood in 1984 and North Adelaide in 2018. No AFL/VFL team won from fifth under this format (1972–1990), and no WAFL team has won under this format as of 2021.

If all matches have the same odds to win, then seed 1 has 37.5% to be champion; seed 2 and 3 have 25% to be champion; seed 4 and 5 have 6.25%;

Seed 1 has two chances to reach the final, and only needs to win 1 match to clinch it. It is only eliminated before the final if loses against both finalists, and doesn´t win any match.

Seed 2 and 3 need to win 2 out of 3 matches to reach the final (they are like in a best-of-3 semi-final, but with different opponents in any round).

Seed 4 and 5 need to win all other 4 opponents without loss to be crowned. Any loss means its elimination.

Example
The 1994 NSWRL finals occurred as follows:

See also
 McIntyre system
 Top six play-offs
 Page playoff system
 ARL final series

References

Rugby league terminology
Tournament systems